Castalia is a city in Winneshiek County, Iowa, United States. The population was 145 at the 2020 census.

History
The city of Castalia was originally called Rattletrap, but during that time it consisted of a solitary trap house. In 1849, it was settled by Hamilton Campbell and his wife, whose descendants inhabit the small city.

The railroad was built through Castalia in 1864. Castalia was incorporated in 1902.

Geography
Castalia is located at  (43.112261, -91.677256).

Demographics

2010 census
At the 2010 census there were 173 people in 82 households, including 49 families, in the city. The racial makup of the city was 100.0% White. Hispanic or Latino of any race were 1.2%.

Of the 82 households 22.0% had children under the age of 18 living with them, 47.6% were married couples living together, 8.5% had a female householder with no husband present, 3.7% had a male householder with no wife present, and 40.2% were non-families. 35.4% of households were one person and 18.3% were one person aged 65 or older. The average household size was 2.11 and the average family size was 2.71.

The median age was 48.6 years. 20.8% of residents were under the age of 18; 4.6% were between the ages of 18 and 24; 19% were from 25 to 44; 35.2% were from 45 to 64; and 20.2% were 65 or older. The gender makeup of the city was 49.1% male and 50.9% female.

2000 census
At the 2000 census there were 175 people in 79 households, including 48 families, in the city. The racial makup of the city was 95.43% White, 2.29% from other races, and 2.29% from two or more races. Hispanic or Latino of any race were 4.00%.

Of the 79 households 24.1% had children under the age of 18 living with them, 49.4% were married couples living together, 7.6% had a female householder with no husband present, and 39.2% were non-families. 30.4% of households were one person and 11.4% were one person aged 65 or older. The average household size was 2.22 and the average family size was 2.69.

The age distribution was 19.4% under the age of 18, 9.1% from 18 to 24, 25.7% from 25 to 44, 31.4% from 45 to 64, and 14.3% 65 or older. The median age was 40 years. For every 100 females, there were 108.3 males. For every 100 females age 18 and over, there were 113.6 males.

The median household income was $30,417 and the median family income  was $25,833. Males had a median income of $28,750 versus $18,750 for females. The per capita income for the city was $17,228. About 21.7% of families and 15.4% of the population were below the poverty line, including 22.2% of those under the age of eighteen and none of those sixty five or over.

Education
The community is within the South Winneshiek Community School District.

References

Cities in Iowa
Cities in Winneshiek County, Iowa